The Ningde–Shangrao Expressway, commonly referred to as the Ningshang Expressway is an expressway that connects the cities of Ningde in Fujian Province and Shangrao in Jiangxi Province, in the East China region of China.

The expressway is a spur of G15 Shenyang–Haikou Expressway.

Exit

References

Chinese national-level expressways
Proposed roads
Ningde-Shangrao Expressway
Ningde-Shangrao Expressway
Ningde-Shangrao Expressway
Ningde-Shangrao Expressway